Events in the year 1960 in Norway.

Incumbents
 Monarch – Olav V
 Prime Minister – Einar Gerhardsen (Labour Party)

Events

 1 May – The U-2 incident reveals that the United States uses Norwegian air bases as part of spying missions against the Soviet Union.
 20 August – King Olav V declares television officially opened in Norway.
 6 October – The Akershus University Hospital opens
 1 November – Population Census: 3,591,234 inhabitants in Norway.
 9 December – The Norwegian government decides, contrary to the advice of the Norwegian military leadership, that Norway will not acquire any nuclear weapons.
 NRK began its regular television broadcasts.

Popular culture

Sports
1960 in Norwegian football
Norway at the 1960 Summer Olympics
Norway at the 1960 Winter Olympics

Music

Film
Struggle for Eagle Peak (Venner), starring Alf Malland

Literature
Jens Bjørneboe - Den onde hyrde

Television

Notable births

17 January – Vivian Knarvik Bugge, politician.
7 February – Ingunn Foss, politician
2 March – Svein Stølen, chemist.
10 March – Agnete Haaland, actress and theatre director.
19 March – Hanne Woods, curler.
21 March – Gunn Nyborg, footballer.
29 March – Sonja Mandt-Bartholsen, politician
4 April – Brit Volden, orienteering competitor.
8 April – Jørn Sigurd Maurud, jurist and civil servant.
27 April – Hanne Hegh, handball player.
25 June – Randi Karlstrøm, politician
26 June – Rigmor Aasrud, politician
16 July – Trond Abrahamsen, ice hockey player.
17 July – Toril Marie Øie, Chief Justice of the Supreme Court of Norway.
21 July – Brynjar Aa, dramatist
27 July – Sverre Løken, rower.
2 August – Joar Vaadal, footballer.
10 August – Øystein Alme, author
2 September – Kristin Halvorsen, politician and Minister
2 September – Ida Hjort Kraby, civil servant.
2 September – Vetle Lid Larssen, journalist and novelist.
4 September – Ragnhild Aarflot Kalland, politician
18 September – Nils Petter Molvær, jazz trumpeter, composer and producer
1 October – Per Bergersen, musician (died 1990)
26 October – Arne Berggren, writer and musician.
18 December – Niels Christian Geelmuyden, journalist and writer
11 December – Frode Grytten, writer and journalist

Notable deaths

15 January – Carl Fredrik Holmboe, engineer (b. 1882)
2 February – Eilert Falch-Lund, sailor and Olympic gold medallist (b. 1875) 
15 May – Rolf Jacobsen, boxer (b. 1899)
22 May – Anders Tjøstolvsen Noddeland, politician (b. 1885)
25 June – Carl Alfred Pedersen, gymnast and triple jumper (b. 1882)
22 July
Bodil Katharine Biørn, missionary known as Mother Katharine (b. 1871)
Hans Nordvik, rifle shooter and Olympic gold medallist (b. 1880).
29 July – Kristian Østervold, sailor and Olympic gold medallist (b. 1885).
29 July – Carl Wilhelm Rubenson, mountaineer (born 1885 in Sweden).
12 September – Jakob Nilsson Vik, politician and Minister (b. 1882)
28 September – Gabriel Kielland, architect, painter and designer (b. 1871)
14 October – Sigurd Hoel, author and publishing consultant (b. 1890)
27 November – Gunnar Kaasen, musher, delivered diphtheria antitoxin to Nome, Alaska in 1925, as the last leg of a dog sled relay that saved the city from an epidemic (b. 1882)
13 December – Christopher Hornsrud, politician and Prime Minister of Norway (b. 1859)
13 December – Einar Jansen, historian, genealogist and archivist (b. 1893)
17 December – Arne Sejersted, sailor and Olympic gold medallist (b.1877).
18 December – Trygve Schjøtt, sailor and Olympic gold medallist (b.1882).
28 December – Karl Eugen Hammerstedt, politician (b.1903)

Full date missing
Birger Gotaas, journalist (b. 1883).

See also

References

External links